Transtextuality is defined as the "textual transcendence of the text". According to Gérard Genette transtextuality is "all that sets the text in relationship, whether obvious or concealed, with other texts" and it "covers all aspects of a particular text". Genette described transtextuality as a "more inclusive term" than intertextuality.

Subtypes
Genette provided five subtypes of transtextuality, namely: intertextuality, paratextuality, architextuality, metatextuality, and hypertextuality (also known as hypotextuality).

Description
The following are the descriptions for the five subtypes of transtextuality:

Intertextuality could be in the form of quotation, plagiarism, or allusion.
Paratextuality is the relation between one text and its paratext that surrounds the main body of the text. Examples are titles, headings, and prefaces.
Architextuality is the designation of a text as a part of a genre or genres
Metatextuality is the explicit or implicit critical commentary of one text on another text
Hypotextuality or hypertextuality is the relation between a text and a preceding 'hypotext' – a text or genre on which it is based but which it transforms, modifies, elaborates or extends. Examples are parody, spoof, sequel, and translation.  In information technology, hypertextuality is a text that takes the reader directly to other texts.

See also
 Literary theory
 Post-structuralism
 Semiotics
 Umberto Eco
 Meta
 Transmedia storytelling
Institute for Transtextual and Transcultural Studies

References

Literary concepts
Post-structuralism
 
Transmediation